Secostruma is a genus of subterranean ants in the subfamily Myrmicinae containing the single species Secostruma lethifera. The genus is known from a single worker collected in Gunong Silam, Sabah, Malaysia.

References

Myrmicinae
Monotypic ant genera
Hymenoptera of Asia